The 2003 Presidents Cup was held 20–23 November 2003 at the Links Course at Fancourt Hotel and Country Club in George, Western Cape, South Africa. The United States and International team tied the competition 17–17, and after three tied playoff holes between Tiger Woods and Ernie Els, it was decided that the Cup would be shared by agreement of the captains and players. The honorary chairman was South African President Thabo Mbeki. The event was originally scheduled to be held in autumn 2002 before the 2001 Ryder Cup was postponed to 2002 due to the September 11 attacks in the United States.

Format
Both teams had 12 players and a non-playing captain. The competition was four days long with 34 matches worth a single point each.  Six foursome matches were played on the first day. On the second day, five four-ball matches were played in the morning and five foursome matches were played in the afternoon. On the third day, six four-ball matches were played. The competition concluded with twelve singles matches on the final day.

Teams

OWGR as of 16 November 2003, the last ranking before the Cup

Thursday's matches
All matches played were foursomes.

Friday's matches

Morning four-ball

Afternoon foursomes

Saturday's matches
All matches played were four-ball.

Sunday's matches

Singles

Individual player records
Each entry refers to the win–loss–half record of the player.

International

United States

External links
Official scores

Presidents Cup
Golf tournaments in South Africa
Sport in the Western Cape
Presidents Cup
Presidents Cup
Presidents Cup